Kris Derrig (April 6, 1954 – May 14, 1987) was an American luthier and musician born in Greenfield, Massachusetts. As a guitar builder, he is best known for building Slash's recording guitar, used in the Guns N' Roses album Appetite For Destruction, as well as many other counterfeit 1959 Gibson Les Paul.

Derrig died in May 1987 from a form of cancer. He didn't live to see the impact his Les Paul copies would have on Guns N' Roses debut album, Appetite For Destruction, and the signature sound of Slash.

References 

1954 births
1987 deaths
American luthiers
Guitar makers
People from Greenfield, Massachusetts